Roderick Tuck (28 May 1934 – 10 May 2006) was a British skier. He competed in the biathlon and the cross-country skiing at the 1964 Winter Olympics.

References

External links
 

1934 births
2006 deaths
British male biathletes
British male cross-country skiers
Olympic biathletes of Great Britain
Olympic cross-country skiers of Great Britain
Biathletes at the 1964 Winter Olympics
Cross-country skiers at the 1964 Winter Olympics
Sportspeople from Portsmouth